There have been many extremely large explosions, accidental and intentional, caused by modern high explosives, boiling liquid expanding vapour explosions (BLEVEs), older explosives such as gunpowder, volatile petroleum-based fuels such as gasoline, and other chemical reactions. This list contains the largest known examples, sorted by date. An unambiguous ranking in order of severity is not possible; a 1994 study by historian Jay White of 130 large explosions suggested that they need to be ranked by an overall effect of power, quantity, radius, loss of life and property destruction, but concluded that such rankings are difficult to assess.

The weight of an explosive does not directly correlate with the energy or destructive impact of an explosion, as these can depend upon many other factors such as containment, proximity, purity, preheating, and external oxygenation (in the case of thermobaric weapons, gas leaks and BLEVEs).

In this article, explosion means "the sudden conversion of potential energy (chemical or mechanical) into kinetic energy", as defined by the US National Fire Protection Association, or the common dictionary meaning, "a violent and destructive shattering or blowing apart of something". No distinction is made as to whether it is a deflagration with subsonic propagation or a detonation with supersonic propagation.

Before World War I

Fall of Antwerp 

On 4 April 1585, during the Spanish siege of Antwerp, a fortified bridge named "Puente Farnesio" had been built by the Spanish on the River Scheldt. The Dutch launched four large hellburners (explosive fire ships filled with gunpowder and rocks) to destroy the bridge and thereby isolate the city from reinforcement. Three of the hellburners failed to reach the target, but one containing four tons of explosive struck the bridge. It did not explode immediately, which gave time for some curious Spaniards to board it. There was then a devastating blast that killed 800 Spaniards on the bridge, throwing bodies, rocks and pieces of metal a distance of several kilometres. A small tsunami arose in the river, the ground shook for kilometres around and a large, dark cloud covered the area.

Wanggongchang Explosion 

Around nine in the morning of 30 May 1626, an explosion at the Wanggongchang Armory in Ming-era Beijing, China, destroyed almost everything within an area of  surrounding the site. The estimated death toll was 20,000. About half of Beijing, from Xuanwumen Gate in the South to today's West Chang'an Boulevard in the North, was affected.

Great Torrington, Devon 

On 16 February 1646, 80 barrels (5.72 tons) of gunpowder were accidentally ignited by a stray spark during the Battle of Torrington in the English Civil War, destroying the church in which the magazine was located and killing several Royalist guards and a large number of Parliamentarian prisoners who were being held there. The explosion effectively ended the battle, bringing victory to the Parliamentarians. It narrowly missed killing the Parliamentarian commander, Sir Thomas Fairfax. Great damage was caused.

Delft Explosion 

About 30 tonnes of gunpowder exploded on 12 October 1654, destroying much of the city of Delft in the Netherlands. Over a hundred people were killed and thousands were injured.

Siege of Buda 

On July 22, 1686, 80 tons of gunpowder exploded in the castle of Buda, killing 1500 Ottoman defenders and destroying a large portion of the defenses. According to contemporary accounts, the blast wave also pushed the Danube out of its riverbed, destroying boats and causing flooding on the left (Pest) bank. The cause of the explosion was most likely a lucky shot fired by a famed Italian artillery officer and Franciscan monk, "Fiery" Gabriel, which penetrated into the underground ammunition dump.

Destruction of the Parthenon 

On 26 September 1687, the Parthenon, hitherto intact, was partially destroyed when an Ottoman ammunition bunker inside was struck by a Venetian mortar. 300 Turkish soldiers were killed in the explosion.

Brescia Explosion 

On 18 August 1769, the Bastion of San Nazaro in Brescia, Italy was struck by lightning. The resulting fire ignited 90 tonnes of gunpowder being stored, and the subsequent explosion destroyed one-sixth of the city and killed 3,000 people.

Leiden gunpowder disaster 

On 12 January 1807, a ship carrying hundreds of barrels of black powder exploded in the city of Leiden in the Kingdom of Holland. The disaster killed 151 people and destroyed over 200 buildings in the city.

Siege of Almeida 

On 26 August 1810, in Almeida, Portugal, during the Peninsular War phase of the Napoleonic Wars, French Grande Armée forces commanded by Marshal André Masséna laid siege to the garrison; the garrison was commanded by British Brigadier General William Cox. A shell made a chance hit on the medieval castle, within the star fortress, which was being used as the powder magazine. It ignited 4,000 prepared charges, which in turn ignited 68 tonnes of black powder and 1,000,000 musket cartridges. The ensuing explosions killed 600 defenders and wounded 300. The medieval castle was razed to the ground and sections of the defences were damaged. Unable to reply to the French cannonade without gunpowder, Cox was forced to capitulate the following day with the survivors of the blast and 100 cannons. The French losses during the operation were 58 killed and 320 wounded.

Fort York magazine explosion 

On 27 April 1813, the magazine of Fort York in York, Ontario (now Toronto) was fired by retreating British troops during an American invasion. 13.6 tonnes of gunpowder and thirty thousand cartridges exploded sending debris, cannon and musket balls over the American troops. Thirty-eight soldiers, including General Zebulon Pike, the American commander, were killed and 222 were wounded.

Battle of Negro Fort 

On 27 July 1816, a fort built in the War of 1812 by the British Army at Prospect Bluff in Spanish West Florida, and occupied by about 330 Maroons, Seminole, and Choctaw, was attacked by Andrew Jackson's navy as part of the First Seminole War. There was an exchange of cannon fire; the first red-hot cannonball fired by the navy entered the fort's powder magazine, which exploded. About 270 men, women and children lay dead. General Edmund P. Gaines later said that the "explosion was awful and the scene horrible beyond description." Reports mention no American military casualties.

Siege of Multan 

On 30 December 1848, in Multan during the Second Anglo-Sikh War, a British mortar shell hit 180 tonnes of gunpowder stored in a mosque, causing an explosion and many casualties.

Great fire of Newcastle and Gateshead 

Agios Ioannis Church Explosion 

On 6 November 1856 lightning struck 3,000 to 6,000 hundredweight (roughly 150-300 tonnes) of gunpowder stored by the Ottoman Empire in the bell tower of the Agios Ioannis church near the Palace of the Grand Master of the Knights of Rhodes in Rhodes, triggering a blast that destroyed large parts of the city and killed 4,000 people.

The Battle of the Crater during the siege of Petersburg, Virginia

During the American Civil War at 4:44 a.m. on July 30, 1864, the Union Army of the Potomac besieging the Confederate Army of Northern Virginia at Petersburg, Virginia detonated a mine containing 320 kegs of gunpowder, totalling 8,000 pounds (3,600 kg) under the Confederate entrenchments. The explosion killed 278 Confederate soldiers of the 18th and 22nd South Carolina regiments and created a crater 170 feet (52 m) long, 100 to 120 feet (30 to 37 m) wide, and at least 30 feet (9 m) deep. After the explosion, attacking Union forces charged into the crater instead of around its lip. Trapped in the crater of their own making, the Union forces were easy targets for the Confederate soldiers once they recovered from the shock of the explosion. Union forces suffered 3798 casualties (killed, wounded, or captured) vs 1491 total losses for the Confederates. The Union forces failed to break through the Confederate defences despite the success of the mine. The Battle of the Crater (as it came to be called) was thus a victory for the Confederacy. However, the siege continued.

Fort Fisher Magazine explosion 

In 1865 after the Union Army captured Fort Fisher, North Carolina, the accidental explosion of the fort magazine resulted in an estimated 200 deaths.

Mobile magazine explosion 

On 25 May 1865, in Mobile, Alabama, in the United States, an ordnance depot (magazine) exploded, killing 300 people. This event occurred six weeks after the end of the American Civil War, during the occupation of the city by victorious Federal troops.

Flood Rock explosion

On 10 October 1885 in New York City, the U.S. Army Corps of Engineers detonated 300,000 pounds (150 t) of explosives on Flood Rock, annihilating the island, in order to clear the Hell Gate tidal strait for the benefit of East River shipping traffic. The explosion sent a geyser of water  in the air; the blast was felt as far away as Princeton, New Jersey. The explosion has been described as "the largest planned explosion before testing began for the atomic bomb". Rubble from the detonation was used in 1890 to fill the gap between Great Mill Rock and Little Mill Rock, merging the two into a single island, Mill Rock.

Explosion of steamship Cabo Machichaco
On 3 November 1893, in Santander, Spain, the steamship  caught fire when she was docked. She was laden with 51 tons of dynamite and 12 tons of sulfuric acid from Galdácano, Basque Country, but authorities were unaware of this. Municipal firefighters and crew from other ships boarded Cabo Machichaco to help fight the fire, while local dignitaries and a large crowd of people watched from the shore. At 4:45 pm a huge explosion destroyed the ship and nearby buildings and created a huge wave that washed over the seafront.

Braamfontein explosion 

On 19 February 1896, an explosives train at Braamfontein station in Johannesburg, loaded with between 56 and 60 tons of blasting gelatine for the gold mines of the Witwatersrand and having been standing for three and a half days in searing heat, was struck by a shunting train. Surrounding suburbs were destroyed, and roughly 3,000 people lost their homes. Almost every window in Johannesburg was broken.

USS Maine 

On 15 February 1898, more than 5 tons of gunpowder exploded on the USS Maine in the Havana Harbor, Spanish Cuba, killing 266 on board. Spanish investigations found that it was likely started by spontaneous combustion of the adjacent coal bunker or accidental ignition of volatile gases. The 1898 US Navy investigation laid the blame on a mine, which led to public outrage in the United States and support for the Spanish–American War.

DuPont Powder Mill explosion, Fontanet, Indiana 

On 15 October 1907, approximately 40,000 kegs of powder exploded in Fontanet, Indiana, killing between 50 and 80 people, and destroying the town.

DuPont Powder Mill Explosion, Pleasant Prairie, Wisconsin 

Several hundred people were injured. The plant was closed at the time, so deaths were light, with only three plant employees being killed, E. S. "Old Man" Thompson, Clarence Brady and Joseph Flynt, and Elgin, Illinois resident Alice Finch, who died of shock. Most buildings in a  radius were rendered flat or uninhabitable. Residents in nearby Lake County, Illinois saw the fireball and remembering the Peshtigo fire fled their houses, jumping into Lake Michigan. Police in Chicago scoured the streets, looking for the site of a bombing. A DuPont spokesman was reported as being perplexed by the coverage of the blast, quoted as saying "explosions occur every day in steel mills, flouring mills and grain elevators with hardly a line in the paper."

Alum Chine explosion 

Alum Chine was a Welsh freighter (out of Cardiff) carrying 343 tons of dynamite for use during construction of the Panama Canal. She was anchored off Hawkins Point, near the entrance to Baltimore Harbor in Baltimore, Maryland. She exploded on 7 March 1913, killing over 30, injuring about 60, and destroying a tugboat and two barges. Most accounts describe two distinct explosions.

World War I

HMS Princess Irene at Sheerness 
On 27 May 1915, the converted minelayer  suffered a blast. A child ashore was killed by another fragment. A total of 352 people were killed but one crew member survived, with severe burns. The ship had been loaded with 300 naval mines containing more than 150 tons of high explosive. An inquiry blamed faulty priming, possibly by untrained personnel.

Faversham explosion 

On 2 April 1916, an explosion ripped through the gunpowder mill at Uplees, near Faversham, Kent, when 200 tons of TNT ignited. 105 people died in the explosion. The munitions factory was next to the Thames estuary, and the explosion was heard across the estuary as far away as Norwich, Great Yarmouth, and Southend-on-Sea, where domestic windows were blown out and two large plate-glass shop windows shattered.

Battle of Jutland 

On 31 May 1916, three British Grand Fleet battlecruisers were destroyed by cordite deflagrations initiated by armour-piercing shells fired by the Imperial German Navy's High Seas Fleet. At 16:02  was cut in two by deflagration of the forward magazine and sank immediately with all but two of her crew of 1,019. German eyewitness reports and the testimony of modern divers suggest all her magazines exploded. The wreck is now a debris field. At 16:25  was cut in two by detonation of the forward magazine and sank with all but 21 of her crew of 1,283. As the rear section capsized it also exploded. At 18:30  was cut in two by detonation of the midships magazine and sank in 90 seconds with all but six of her crew. 1,026 men died, including Rear Admiral Hood. An armoured cruiser, was a fourth ship to suffer an explosive deflagration at Jutland with at least 893 men killed. The rear magazine was seen to detonate followed by more explosions as the cordite flash travelled along an ammunition passage beneath her broadside guns. Eyewitness reports suggest that  may also have suffered an explosion as she was lost during the night action with 857 dead, all hands. British reports say she was seen to blow up. German reports speak of the ship being overwhelmed at close range and sinking. Finally, during the confused night actions in the early hours of 1 June, the German pre-dreadnought  was hit by one, or possibly two, torpedoes from the British destroyer , which detonated one of Pommerns  gun magazines. The resulting explosion broke the ship in half and killed the entire crew of 839 men.

Mines on the first day of the Somme 

On the morning of 1 July 1916, a series of 19 mines of varying sizes was blown to start the Battle of the Somme. The explosions constituted what was then the loudest human-made sound in history, and could be heard in London. The crater is known as Lochnagar Crater after the trench from where the main tunnel was started.

Black Tom explosion 

On 30 July 1916, sabotage by German agents caused  of explosives bound for Europe, along with another  on Johnson Barge No. 17, to explode in Jersey City, New Jersey, a major dock in New York Harbor. There were few deaths, but about 100 injuries. Damage included buildings on Ellis Island, parts of the Statue of Liberty, and much of Jersey City.

Silvertown explosion 

On 19 January 1917, parts of Silvertown in East London were devastated by a TNT explosion at the Brunner-Mond munitions factory. 73 people died and hundreds were injured.

Quickborn explosion 
On 10 February 1917, a chain reaction in an ammunition plant "Explosivstoffwerk Thorn" in Quickborn-Heide (northern Germany) killed at least 115 people (some sources say over 200 people), mostly young female workers.

Plzeň explosion 
Škoda Works in Bolevec, Plzeň, was the biggest ammunition plant in Austria-Hungary. A series of explosions on 25 May 1917 killed 300 workers. This event inspired Karel Čapek to write the novel Krakatit (1922).

Mines in the Battle of Messines 

The explosions created 19 large craters, killed about 10,000 German soldiers, and were heard as far away as London and Dublin. Determining the power of explosions is difficult, but this was probably the largest planned explosion in history until the 1945 Trinity atomic weapon test, and the largest non-nuclear planned explosion until the 1947 British Heligoland detonation (below). The Messines mines detonation killed more people than any other non-nuclear man-made explosion in history.

Halifax explosion 

On 6 December 1917,  and  collided in the harbour of Halifax, Nova Scotia. Mont-Blanc carried 2,653 tonnes of various explosives, mostly picric acid. After the collision the ship caught fire, drifted into town, and exploded. 1,950 people were killed and much of Halifax was destroyed. Halifax historian Jay White in 1994 concluded "Halifax Harbour remains unchallenged in overall magnitude as long as five criteria are considered together: number of casualties, force of blast, radius of devastation, quantity of explosive material, and total value of property destroyed."

Chilwell Munitions Factory Explosion 

On 1 July 1918, the National Shell Filling Factory No 6 (Chilwell, near Nottingham, England) was partly destroyed when 8 tons of TNT exploded in the dry mix part of the factory. Approximately 140 workers – mainly young women, known as the 'Chilwell Canaries' because contact with picric acid turned their skin yellow – were killed, though the true number has never been established. An unknown number of people were injured, though estimates place the figure around 250. Because of the sensitivity of the subject, reports of the explosion were censored until after the Armistice. The cause of the explosion was never officially established, though present-day authorities on explosives consider it was due to a combination of factors: an exceptionally hot day, high production demands and lax safety precautions.

Split Rock explosion 

On 2 July 1918, a munitions factory near Syracuse, New York, exploded after a mixing motor in the main TNT building overheated. The fire rapidly spread through the wooden structure of the main factory. Approximately 1–3 tons of TNT were involved in the blast, which levelled the structure and killed 50 workers (conflicting reports mention 52 deaths).

T. A. Gillespie Company Shell Loading Plant explosion 

On 4 October 1918, an ammunition plant — operated by the T. A. Gillespie Company and located in the Morgan area of Sayreville in Middlesex County, New Jersey — exploded and triggered a fire. The subsequent series of explosions continued for three days. The facility, said to be one of the largest in the world at the time, was destroyed, along with more than 300 buildings forcing reconstruction of South Amboy and Sayreville. Over 100 people died in this accident.

Interwar period

Oppau explosion 

Nixon Nitration Works disaster 

On 1 March 1924, an explosion destroyed a building in Nixon, New Jersey, used for processing ammonium nitrate. The explosion touched off fires in surrounding buildings in the Nixon Nitration Works that contained other highly flammable materials. The disaster killed 20 and destroyed 40 buildings.

Leeudoringstad explosion 
On 17 July 1932, a train carrying 320 to 330 tons of dynamite from the De Beers factory at Somerset West to the Witwatersrand exploded and flattened the small town of Leeudoringstad in South Africa. Five people were killed and 11 injured in the sparsely-populated area.

Neunkirchen gas detonation 
On 10 February 1933, a gas storage in Neunkirchen, Territory of the Saar Basin, detonated during maintenance work. The detonation could be heard at  distance. The death toll was 68, and 160 were injured.

New London School explosion 

On 18 March 1937, a natural gas leak caused an explosion, destroying the London School of New London, Texas. The disaster killed more than 295 students and teachers, making it the deadliest school disaster in American history. Letters of support were sent from around the world, including a telegram from Adolf Hitler.

Hirakata ammunition dump explosion 
On 1 March 1939, Warehouse No. 15 of the Imperial Japanese Army's Kinya ammunition dump in Hirakata, Osaka Prefecture, Japan, suffered a catastrophic explosion, the sound of which could be heard throughout the Keihan area. Additional explosions followed over the next few days as the depot burned, for a total of 29 explosions by 3 March. Japanese officials reported that 94 people died, 604 were injured, and 821 houses were damaged, with 4,425 households in all suffering the effects of the explosions.

World War II

Pluton 
On 13 September 1939, the  exploded and sank while offloading naval mines in Casablanca, in French Morocco. The explosion killed 186 men, destroyed three nearby armed trawlers, and damaged nine more.

Hercules Powder Plant 
At least 51 people were killed, over 100 injured, and twenty buildings flattened. It remains unclear if this was an industrial accident, or sabotage by pro-IRA or pro-Nazi factions.

SS Clan Fraser 
On 6 April 1941,  was moored in Piraeus Harbour, Greece. Three German Luftwaffe bombs struck her, igniting 350 tonnes of TNT; a nearby barge carried a further 100 tonnes which also detonated. Royal Navy ships  and  attempted to tow her out of harbour and succeeded in getting beyond the breakwater, after the tow line had broken three times. She then exploded, levelling large areas of the port. This was witnessed by post-war author Roald Dahl, who was piloting a Hawker Hurricane fighter plane for the Royal Air Force.

HMS Hood 
On 24 May 1941,  sank in three minutes after the stern magazine detonated during the Battle of the Denmark Strait. The wreck has been located in three pieces, suggesting additional detonation of a forward magazine. There were only three survivors from the crew of 1,418.

HMS Barham 
The main magazines explosion was captured on film by a Pathé News cameraman on board the nearby HMS Valiant.

Smederevo Fortress explosion 

During World War II, German invading forces in Serbia used Smederevo Fortress for ammunition storage. Much of the southern wall of the fortress was destroyed, the nearby railway station, packed with people, was blown away, and most of the buildings in the city were turned into debris. Around 2,500 people died in the explosion, and half of the inhabitants were injured (approximately 5,500).

SS Surrey 
On the night of 10 June 1942, the  torpedoed the 8,600-ton British freighter Surrey in the Caribbean Sea. Five thousand tons of dynamite in the cargo detonated after the ship sank. The shock wave lifted U-68 out of the water as if she had suffered a torpedo hit, and both diesel engines and the gyrocompass were disabled.

SS Hatimura 

On the night of 3 November 1942, torpedoes detonated the ammunition cargo of the 6,690-ton British freighter Hatimura. Both the freighter and attacking submarine  were destroyed by the explosion.

Naples Caterina Costa explosion 
On 28 March 1943, in the port of Naples, a fire broke out on Caterina Costa, an 8,060-ton motor ship with arms and supplies (1,000 tons of gas, 900 tons of explosives, tanks and others); the fire became uncontrollable, causing a devastating explosion. A large number of buildings around were destroyed or badly damaged. Some ships nearby caught fire and sank, and hot parts of the ship and tanks were thrown great distances. More than 600 dead and over 3000 wounded.

Bombay Docks explosion 

Debris fell across the city landing miles away from the site of the explosion. The bales of cotton on board the ship caught fire and fell from the sky causing fires in other parts of the city. The explosion was strong enough to be detected on seismographs in Shimla, a city more than 1700 km from the site of the explosion.

Bergen Harbour explosion 
The air pressure from the explosion and the tsunami that followed flattened whole neighbourhoods near the harbour. Fires broke out in the aftermath, leaving 5,000 people homeless. 160 people were killed, and 5,000 wounded.

SS Paul Hamilton 
The ship and 580 personnel aboard were destroyed within 30 seconds when the cargo of bombs and explosives detonated.

West Loch disaster 

On 21 May 1944, an ammunition handling accident in Pearl Harbor destroyed six LSTs and three LCTs. Four more LSTs, ten tugs, and a net tender were damaged. Eleven buildings were destroyed ashore and nine more damaged. Between 132 and nearly 400 military personnel were killed.

4th of July Disaster in Aarhus 

On 4 July 1944, a huge explosion in the city of Aarhus, Denmark occurred when a barge loaded with ammunition exploded in the harbour, killing 39 people and injuring another 250.

Port Chicago disaster 

On 17 July 1944, in Port Chicago, California, SS E. A. Bryan exploded while loading ammunition bound for the Pacific, with an estimated  of high explosive (HE), incendiary bombs, depth charges, and other ammunition. Another  waiting on nearby rail cars also exploded. The total explosive content is described as between 1,600 and 2,136 tons of TNT. 320 were killed instantly, another 390 wounded. Most of the killed and wounded were African American enlisted men. Following the explosion, 258 fellow sailors refused to load ordnance; 50 of these, called the "Port Chicago 50", were convicted of mutiny even though they were willing to carry out any order that did not involve loading ordnance under unsafe conditions.

Cleveland East Ohio Gas explosion 

On 20 October 1944, a liquefied natural gas storage tank in Cleveland, Ohio, split and leaked its contents, which spread, caught fire, and exploded. A half hour later, another tank exploded as well. The explosions destroyed , killed 130, and left 600 homeless.

USS Mount Hood 
On 10 November 1944,  exploded in Seeadler Harbor at Manus Island in Australian New Guinea, with an estimated 3,800 tons of ordnance material on board. The largest remaining piece of the hull was found in the trench and measured . Several other nearby ships were also damaged or destroyed. Altogether 372 were killed and 371 injured in the blast.

RAF Fauld explosion 

On 27 November 1944, the RAF Ammunition Depot at Fauld, Staffordshire, became the site of the largest explosion in the UK, when 3,700 tonnes of bombs stored in underground bunkers covering  exploded en masse. The explosion was caused by bombs being taken out of store, primed for use, and replaced with the detonators still installed when unused. The death toll was approximately 78, including RAF personnel, six Italian prisoners of war, civilian employees, and local people. In the similar Port Chicago disaster (above), about half the weight of bombs was high explosive. If the same is true of the Fauld Explosion, it would have been equivalent to about 2 kilotons of TNT.

Japanese aircraft carrier Unryu 
On 19 December 1944,  exploded when torpedoes fired by  detonated the forward magazine.

SS John Burke 
On December 28, 1944, while transporting ammunition to Mindoro, Philippines, the Liberty ship SS John Burke was hit by a Japanese kamikaze aircraft, and disintegrated in a tremendous explosion with the loss of all hands.

Japanese battleship Yamato 

Trinity calibration test 

On 7 May 1945, 100 tons of TNT were stacked on a wooden tower and exploded to test the instrumentation prior to the test of the first atomic bomb.

1945–2000

Futamata Tunnel Explosion 
On 12 November 1945, when the occupation troops were trying to dispose of 530 tons of ammunition, there was an explosion in a tunnel in Soeda, Fukuoka Prefecture, Kyushu Island. According to a confirmed official report, 147 local residents were killed and 149 people injured.

Texas City Disaster 

On 16 April 1947, SS Grandcamp, loaded with about 2,300 tons ammonium nitrate, exploded in port at Texas City, Texas. 581 died and over 5,000 were injured. This is generally considered the worst industrial accident in United States history.

Heligoland "British Bang" 

On 18 April 1947, British engineers attempted to destroy the abandoned German fortifications on the evacuated island of Heligoland in what became known as the "British Bang". The island had been fortified during the war with a submarine base and airfield. Roughly 4000 tons of surplus World War II ammunition were placed in various locations around the island and set off. A significant portion of the fortifications were destroyed, although some survived. According to Willmore, the energy released was 1.3×1013 J, or about 3.2 kilotons of TNT equivalent. The blast is listed in the Guinness Book of World Records under largest single explosive detonation, although Minor Scale in 1985 was larger (see below).

Ocean Liberty in Brest, France 
On 28 July 1947, the Norwegian cargo ship Ocean Liberty exploded in the French port of Brest. The cargo consisted of 3,300 tonnes of ammonium nitrate in addition to paraffin and petrol. The explosion killed 22 people, hundreds were injured, 4,000–5,000 buildings were damaged.

Cádiz Explosion 

On 18 August 1947, a naval ammunition warehouse containing mostly mines and torpedoes exploded in Cádiz, in southern Spain, for unknown reasons. The explosion of 200 tons of TNT destroyed a large portion of the city. Officially, the explosion killed 150 people; the real death toll is suspected to be higher.

General Vatutin cargo ship explosion in Magadan, Russia 
On 19 December 1947, the Liberty class cargo ship General Vatutin exploded in the Soviet port of Magadan at Nagayeva Bay on the Russian Far East. The ship transported 3,313 tonnes of ammonal and TNT for the mining industry. Another cargo ship Vyborg, carrying 193 tonnes of chemical substances including detonators and fuse cords, also detonated from the explosion. More than 90 people were killed, more than 500 were injured. The explosion caused a tsunami with broken ice, damaging and destroying many buildings.

Mitholz, Switzerland
 In December 1947, a Swiss Army ammunition dump exploded at Mitholz, Switzerland. The explosion of 3,000 tonnes of ammunition killed nine people and destroyed every house in the village.

Prüm explosion 

On 15 July 1949 in the German town of Prüm, an underground bunker inside the hill of Kalvarienberg and used previously by the German Army to store ammunition, but now filled with French Army munitions, caught fire. After a mostly successful evacuation, the 500 tonnes of ammunition in the bunker exploded and destroyed large parts of the town. 12 people died and 15 were severely injured.

Cali explosion, Colombia 

On 7 August 1956, seven trucks from the Colombian National Army, carrying more than 40 tons of dynamite, exploded.

Ripple Rock, British Columbia, Canada 

On 5 April 1958, an underwater mountain at Ripple Rock, British Columbia, Canada was levelled by the explosion of 1,375 tonnes of Nitramex 2H, an ammonium nitrate-based explosive. This was one of the largest non-nuclear planned explosions on record, and the subject of the first CBC live broadcast coast-to-coast.

Operation Blowdown 

On 18 July 1963, a test blast of 50 tons of TNT in the Iron Range area of Queensland, Australia, tested the effects of nuclear weapons on tropical rainforest, military targets and ability of troops to transit through the resulting debris field.

CHASE 2, off New Jersey 

On 17 September 1964, the offshore disposal of the ship Village, containing  of obsolete munitions, caused unexpected detonations five minutes after sinking off New Jersey. The detonations were detected on seismic instruments around the world; the incident encouraged intentional detonation of subsequent disposal operations to determine detectability of underwater nuclear testing.

Operation Sailor Hat 

A series of tests, Operation Sailor Hat, was performed off Kaho'olawe Island, Hawaii, in 1965, using conventional explosives to simulate the shock effects of nuclear blasts on naval vessels.

CHASE 3 and 4, off New Jersey 

Feyzin disaster, near Lyon, France 

On 4 January 1966, an LPG spill occurred near Lyon, France, and resulted in a cloud of propane vapour which persisted until it was ignited by a bypassing car. Several tanks erupted in a boiling liquid expanding vapour explosion, causing the deaths of 18 people, the injury of 81 and extensive damage to the site.

Medeu Dam 

On 21 October 1966, a mud flow protection dam near Alma-Ata, Kazakhstan was created by a series of four preliminary explosions of 1,800 tonnes total and a final explosion of 3,600 tonnes of ammonium nitrate-based explosive. On 14 April 1967, the dam was reinforced by an explosion of 3,900 tonnes of ammonium nitrate-based explosive.

CHASE 5, off Puget Sound 

CHASE 6, off New Jersey 

N1 launch explosion 

On 3 July 1969, an N1 rocket in the Soviet Union exploded on the launch pad of Baikonur Cosmodrome, after a turbopump exploded in one of the engines. Using a standard energy release of 43 MJ/kg of kerosene gives about 29 TJ for the energy of the explosion (about 6.93 kt TNT equivalent). Investigators later determined that up to 85% of the fuel in the rocket did not detonate, meaning that the blast yield was likely no more than 1 kt TNT equivalent. Comparing explosions of initially unmixed fuels is difficult (being part detonation and part deflagration).

Old Reliable Mine Blast 
On 9 March 1972, 2,000 tons (4 million pounds) of explosive were detonated inside three levels of tunnels in the Old Reliable Mine near Mammoth, Arizona. The blast was an experimental attempt to break up the ore body so that metals (primarily copper) could be extracted using sulfuric acid in a heap-leach process. The benefits of increased production were short-lived while the costs of managing acid mine drainage due to the sulfide ore body being exposed to oxygen continue to the present day.

Flixborough disaster 

On 1 June 1974, a pipe failure at the Nypro chemical plant in Flixborough, England, caused a large release of flammable cyclohexane vapour. This ignited and the resulting fuel-air explosion destroyed the plant, killing 28 people and injuring 36 more. Beyond the plant 1,821 houses and 167 shops and factories had suffered to a greater or lesser degree. Fires burned for 16 days. The explosion occurred at a weekend otherwise the casualties would have been much heavier. This explosion caused a significant strengthening of safety regulations for chemical plants in the United Kingdom.

Iri station explosion 

On 11 November 1977, a freight train carrying 40 tons of dynamite from Gwangju suddenly exploded at Iri station (present-day Iksan), Jeollabuk-do province, South Korea. The cause of the explosion was accidental ignition by a drunk guard. 59 people died, and 185 others seriously wounded; altogether, over 1,300 people were injured or killed.

Los Alfaques disaster 

On 11 July 1978, an overloaded tanker truck carrying 23 tons of liquefied propylene crashed and ruptured in Spain, emitting a white cloud of ground-hugging fumes which spread into a nearby campground and discothèque before reaching an ignition source and exploding. 217 people were killed and 200 more severely burned.

Murdock BLEVEs 

Benton fireworks disaster

On 27 May 1983, an explosion at an illegal fireworks factory near Benton, Tennessee, killed eleven, injured one, and caused damage within a radius of several miles.

1983 Newark explosion

On 7 January 1983, an explosion of the Texaco oil tank farm was felt for 100–130 miles from Newark, New Jersey claiming 1 life and injuring 22–24 people.

Minor Scale and Misty Picture

Many very large detonations have been carried out in order to simulate the effects of nuclear weapons on vehicles and other military material. The largest publicly known test was conducted by the United States Defense Nuclear Agency (now part of the Defense Threat Reduction Agency) on 27 June 1985 at the White Sands Missile Range in New Mexico.

PEPCON disaster

A  natural gas pipeline ruptured under the stored ammonium perchlorate and added fuel to the later, larger explosions. There were seven detonations in total, the largest being the last. Two people were killed and hundreds injured. The accident was caught on video by a broadcast engineer servicing a transmitter on Black Mountain, between Henderson and Las Vegas.

Arzamas train disaster

The Arzamas explosion, known also as Arzamas train disaster, occurred on 4 June 1988, when three goods wagons transporting hexogen to Kazakhstan exploded on a railway crossing in Arzamas, Gorky Oblast, Soviet Union.

Ufa train disaster

On 4 June 1989, a gas explosion destroyed two trains (37 cars and two locomotives) in the Soviet Union. At least 575 people died and more than 800 were injured.

Intelsat 708 Long March 3B launch failure

On 14 February 1996, a Chinese Long March 3B rocket veered severely off course immediately after clearing the launch tower at the Xichang Satellite Launch Center, then crashed into a nearby city and exploded. Following the disaster, foreign media were kept in a bunker for five hours while, some alleged, the Chinese People's Liberation Army attempted to "clean up" the damage. Officials later blamed the failure on an "unexpected gust of wind" although video shows this is not the case. Xinhua News Agency initially reported 6 deaths and 57 injuries.

Enschede fireworks disaster

On 13 May 2000, 177 tonnes of fireworks exploded in Enschede, in the Netherlands, in which 23 people were killed and 947 were injured. The first explosion had the order of 800 kg TNT equivalence; the final explosion was in the range of 4,000–5,000 kg TNT.

2001–present

AZF chemical factory

On 21 September 2001, an explosion occurred at a fertilizer factory in Toulouse, France. The disaster caused 31 deaths, 2,500 seriously wounded, and 8,000 light injuries. The blast (estimated yield of 20–40 tons of TNT, comparable in scale to the military test Operation Blowdown) was heard 80 km away (50 miles) and registered 3.4 on the Richter magnitude scale. It damaged about 30,000 buildings over about two-thirds of the city, for an estimated total cost of about €2 billion.

Ryongchon disaster

A train exploded in North Korea on 22 April 2004.  According to official figures, 54 people were killed and 1,249 were injured.

Seest fireworks disaster

On 3 November 2004, about 284 tonnes of fireworks exploded in Kolding, in Denmark. One firefighter was killed, and a mass evacuation of 2,000 people saved many lives. The cost of the damage was estimated at €100 million.

Texas City Refinery explosion

On 23 March 2005, there was a hydrocarbon leak due to incorrect operations during a start up which caused a vapour cloud explosion when ignited by a running vehicle engine. There were 15 deaths and more than 170 injured.

2005 Hertfordshire Oil Storage Terminal fire

On 11 December 2005, there was a series of major explosions at the  capacity Buncefield oil depot near Hemel Hempstead, Hertfordshire, England. A smoke cloud covered Hemel Hempstead and nearby parts of west Hertfordshire and Buckinghamshire. There were no fatalities, but there were around 43 injuries (2 serious). The British Geological Survey estimated the equivalent yield of the explosion as 29.5 tonnes TNT.

Sea Launch failure

On 30 January 2007, a Sea Launch Zenit-3SL space rocket exploded on takeoff. This rocket was launched from an uncrewed ship in the middle of the Pacific Ocean, so there were no casualties; the launch platform was damaged and the NSS-8 satellite was destroyed.

2007 Maputo arms depot explosion

On 22 March 2007, a series of explosions over 2.5 hours rocked the Mozambican capital of Maputo. The incident was blamed on high temperatures. Officials confirmed 93 fatalities and more than 300 injuries.

2008 Gërdec explosions

On Saturday, 15 March 2008, at an ex-military ammunition depot in the village of Gërdec in the Vorë Municipality, Albania (14 kilometers from Tirana, the nation's capital), US and Albanian munitions experts were preparing to destroy stockpiles of obsolete ammunition. The main explosion, involving more than 400 tons of propellant in containers, destroyed hundreds of houses within a few kilometres from the depot and broke windows in cars on the Tirana-Durrës highway. A large fire caused a series of smaller but powerful explosions that continued until 2 a.m. on Sunday. The explosions could be heard as far away as the Macedonian capital of Skopje, 170 km (110 mi) away.[1] There were 26 killed, 318 houses were destroyed completely, 200 buildings were seriously damaged, and 188 buildings were less seriously damaged.

2009 Cataño oil refinery fire

On the morning of 23 October 2009, there was a major explosion at the petrol tanks at the Caribbean Petroleum Corporation oil refinery and oil depot in Bayamón, Puerto Rico. The resulting fire was extinguished on 25 October.

Ulyanovsk arms depot explosion

On 13 and 23 November 2009, 120 tons of Soviet-era artillery shells blew up in two separate sets of explosions at the 31st Arsenal of the Caspian Sea Flotilla's ammunition depot near Ulyanovsk, killing ten.

Evangelos Florakis Naval Base explosion

Around 5:45 am local time on 11 July 2011, a fire at a munitions dump at Evangelos Florakis Naval Base near Zygi, Cyprus, caused the explosion of 98 cargo containers holding various types of munitions. The explosion also caused 13 deaths and over 60 injuries. Seismometers at the Mediterranean region recorded the explosion as a M3.0 seismic event.

Cosmo Oil Refinery fire

On 11 March 2011, the Tōhoku earthquake caused natural gas containers in the Cosmo Oil Refinery of Ichihara, Chiba Prefecture, Japan to catch fire, destroying storage tanks and injuring six. As it burned, several pressurized liquefied propane gas storage tanks exploded into fireballs. It was extinguished by the Cosmo Oil Company on 21 March 2011.

Donguz Ammunition depot explosion

On 8–9 October 2012, a Russian ammunition depot, at the Donguz test site, containing 4,000 tons of shells exploded  from Orenburg in Central Russia.

Texas fertilizer plant explosion

On 17 April 2013, a fire culminating in an explosion shortly before 8 p.m. The blast killed 15 people, injured over 160, and destroyed over 150 buildings. The United States Geological Survey recorded the explosion as a 2.1-magnitude earthquake, the equivalent of 7.5–10 tons of TNT.

Lac-Mégantic rail disaster

On 6 July 2013, a train of 73 tank cars of light crude oil ran away down a slight incline, after being left unattended for the night, when the air brakes failed after the locomotive engines were shut down following a small fire. It derailed twelve kilometres away in Lac-Mégantic, Quebec, Canada, igniting the Bakken light crude oil from 44 DOT-111 oil cars. Approximately 3–4 minutes after the initial blast, there was a second explosion from 12 oil cars. A series of smaller blasts followed into the early morning hours, igniting the oil of a total 73 oil cars. The disaster is known to have killed 42 people; five more were missing and presumed dead.

2015 Tianjin explosions

On 12 August 2015, at 23:30, two explosions occurred in the Chinese port Tianjin at a warehouse operated by Ruihai Logistics. The more powerful explosion was estimated at 336 tons TNT equivalent.  173 people were killed, and 8 remain missing.

2016 Salawa armoury explosion
On 5 June 2016, a fire at the largest military armoury in the island nation of Sri Lanka caused a series of explosions that lasted for about 5 hours. One soldier was killed and several others were injured.

2016 San Pablito Market fireworks explosion

On 20 December 2016, a fireworks explosion occurred at the San Pablito Market in the city of Tultepec, north of Mexico City. At least 42 people were killed, and dozens injured.

2020 Tarragona IQOXE plant explosion

On 14 January 2020, an ethylene oxide tank exploded at the IQOXE (Chemical Industries of Ethylene Oxide) plant in Tarragona (Spain).

2020 Beirut explosion

On 4 August 2020, a warehouse containing  of ammonium nitrate exploded following a fire in the Port of Beirut, Lebanon. Following early estimates of the yield of the explosion ranging from hundreds of tons of TNT equivalent to 1.1 kilotons, a study by researchers from the Blast and Impact Research Group at the University of Sheffield estimated the energy of the Beirut explosion to be equivalent to 0.5–1.2 kt of TNT. At least 200 people were killed, more than 6,500 injured, and about 300,000 made homeless. Much of central Beirut was devastated by the blast with property damage estimated at US$10–15 billion.

Comparison with large non-nuclear military ordnance
The most powerful non-nuclear weapons ever designed are the United States' MOAB (standing for Massive Ordnance Air Blast, also nicknamed Mother Of All Bombs, tested in 2003 and used on April 13, 2017, in Achin District, Afghanistan) and the Russian Father of All Bombs (tested in 2007). The MOAB contains  of Composition H6 explosive, which is 1.35 times as powerful as TNT, giving the bomb an approximate yield of 11 t TNT. It would require about 250 MOAB blasts to equal the Halifax explosion (2.9 kt).

Conventional explosions for nuclear testing

Large conventional explosions have been conducted for nuclear testing purposes. Some of the larger ones are listed below.

Other smaller tests include Air Vent I and Flat Top I-III series of 20 tons TNT at Nevada Test Site in 1963–64, Pre Mine Throw and Mine Throw in 1970–1974, Mixed Company 1 & 2 of 20 tons TNT, Middle Gust I-V series of 20 or 100 tons TNT in the early 1970s, Pre Dice Throw and Pre Dice Throw II in 1975, Pre-Direct Course in 1982, SHIST in 1994, and the series Dipole Might in the 1990s and 2000s. Divine Strake was a planned test of 700 tons ANFO at the Nevada Test Site in 2006, but was cancelled.

Largest accidental artificial non-nuclear explosions by magnitude

These yields are approximated by the amount of the explosive material and its properties. They are rough estimates and are not authoritative.

See also
 List of nuclear weapons tests and High explosive nuclear effects testing
 List of accidents and disasters by death toll
 List of accidents and incidents involving transport or storage of ammunition
 SS Richard Montgomery

Notes

References

Explosions